House, also known as House, M.D., is an American medical drama series which premiered on Fox on November 16, 2004. House was created by David Shore. The show follows Dr. Gregory House (Hugh Laurie), an irascible, maverick medical genius who heads a team of diagnosticians at the fictional Princeton-Plainsboro Teaching Hospital (PPTH) in New Jersey. In a typical episode, the team is presented with an unusual case; the storyline follows the diagnosis of the patient's illness, a process often complicated by the internal competition and personal foibles of the diagnostic team. The team leader, House, frequently clashes with his boss Dr. Lisa Cuddy (Lisa Edelstein)  in seasons 1 through 7, and Dr. Eric Foreman in season 8, and his only friend, Dr. James Wilson (Robert Sean Leonard).

In seasons 1 through 3, House's diagnostic team includes Dr. Allison Cameron (Jennifer Morrison), Dr. Robert Chase (Jesse Spencer) and Dr. Eric Foreman (Omar Epps). This team leaves the show in the third season finale "Human Error". The show achieved its highest ranking with the episode "Human Error"; this episode placed the series in first position for the week it aired. Each season introduces a recurring guest star, who appears in a multi-episode story arc. The fourth season was the only exception to this pattern. It introduced seven new characters who compete for the coveted positions on House's team, replacing Cameron, Chase and Foreman. House eventually selects Dr. Chris Taub (Peter Jacobson), Dr. Lawrence Kutner (Kal Penn) and Dr. Remy "Thirteen" Hadley (Olivia Wilde) as his new team; Foreman rejoins soon after. Following Kutner's death in season five, through a series of plot twists, House reacquires Chase, one of the original team members.
When House resigns early in season six, Foreman takes his place, but he soon fires Thirteen, and Taub quits because he was there only to work with House. After this, Foreman hires both Cameron and Chase, but, soon, House comes back, spurring the return of Thirteen and Taub, too. When the dictator ("The Tyrant") dies because of Chase's intentional misunderstanding, Cameron and even Chase decide to leave the PPTH. But, Chase's desire to be part of House's team makes Cameron quit (though she later returns for the episode "Lockdown"). At the beginning of season seven, Thirteen ostensibly goes away to Rome (it's later revealed that this was actually a lie), leaving a vacancy on House's team. House proposes then, giving a chance to the rest of his team, to hire a new member. After some unsuccessful tries, Cuddy hires Martha M. Masters (Amber Tamblyn), a medical student in the episode "Office Politics". In the episode "Last Temptation", Masters takes the final choice to leave House's team. After being incarcerated following the events of "Moving On", House is released on probation thanks to Foreman, who has taken Cuddy's place as the Dean of Medicine. House is initially assigned a single team member, Dr. Chi Park (Charlyne Yi). After securing funding for his department in the season eight episode "Risky Business", House brings on former prison doctor Jessica Adams (Odette Annable) and rehires Chase and Taub.

Since its premiere, the show has constantly received both high ratings and critical acclaim. Eight seasons were aired in the United States, the fourth of which was interrupted by the 2007–2008 Writers Guild of America strike and included only 16 episodes instead of the regular 22–24. Despite this interruption, House achieved its highest number of viewers for the episode "Frozen", for which there were over 29 million viewers on the night it aired due to its position as the lead-out program for Super Bowl XLII. In January 2009, House moved from its Tuesday, 8:00 pm ET slot to a new time slot of Monday nights at 8:00 pm ET, immediately before the Fox hit 24. Fox renewed the show for a seventh season, which premiered on September 20, 2010. An eighth season was announced on May 10, 2011 and premiered on October 3, 2011. On February 8, 2012, Fox announced that the season would be Houses last.

All eight seasons were released on DVD and Blu-ray by Universal in North America, Europe and Australia. As of June 16, 2009, the show has been aired in more than 60 countries, with 86 million viewers worldwide. In the following list, the number in the first column refers to the episode's number within the entire series. The second column indicates the episode's number within that season. "US viewers in millions" refers to the number of Americans in millions who watched the episode live while it was broadcast or by a few hours later with a digital video recorder.

A total of 177 episodes of House were broadcast over eight seasons, with the series finale airing on May 21, 2012.

The show started on November 16, 2004, and received a high viewing rating from the first episode to the last one. It achieved a maximum 29.04 million viewers and its highest overall rank is seventh during its third and fourth seasons. It also ranked sixth in the 18–49 age range during its second season.

Series overview

Episodes

Season 1 (2004–05)

Season 2 (2005–06)

Season 3 (2006–07)

Season 4 (2007–08) 

Note: This season has fewer episodes due to the 2007–2008 Writers Guild of America strike.

Season 5 (2008–09)

Season 6 (2009–10)

Season 7 (2010–11)

Season 8 (2011–12)

Ratings

Home video releases 

The DVDs have been released encoded for regions 1, 2 and 4 as complete season boxed sets. Season one was initially released in the full-screen format, while all other seasons have been released in their originally-broadcast wide-screen format. On February 10, 2009, season one was re-released in the wide-screen format encoded for region 1. Season six was the first season to be released on Blu-ray.

In North America, Region 1, there was a combined season 1–2 box set with 12 discs and a combined season 3–4 box set with nine discs, both released on May 19, 2009 A season 1–4 boxed set was later discontinued. In the UK, Region 2, there was a season 1–3 boxed set released on November 19, 2007 and season 1–5 boxed set released on October 5, 2009. A season 1–4 boxed set has been discontinued. In Australia, Region 4, a season 1–3 boxed set was released on December 5, 2007; seasons 1–4 were released in a boxed set on November 19, 2008 and the seasons 1–5 boxed set was released on September 10, 2009. The season 1–3 boxed set contains 18 discs; the season 1–4 boxed set contains 22 discs; and the season 1–5 boxed set contains 28 discs.

On October 2, 2012 Universal Studios released the entire series in a 41-disc DVD set.

Notes

References 

General

Further reading

External links 
 
 

House (TV series) episodes
House

it:Dr. House - Medical Division#Episodi